Tuthill is an unincorporated community in Bennett County, South Dakota, United States. Tuthill has been assigned the ZIP code of 57574.

Tuthill was laid out in 1920 by J. B. Tuthill, and named for him.

Demographics
Tuthill is not tracked by the United States Census Bureau.

Education
The Bennett County School District serves all of Bennett County.

References

Unincorporated communities in Bennett County, South Dakota
Unincorporated communities in South Dakota